St Joseph's College (Irish: Colaiste Naomh Iósaf) is a Catholic maintained secondary school in Belfast, Northern Ireland. It is located in the Ravenhill area of south Belfast.

History
The college opened on 1 September 1992. It was formed by the coming together of St. Monica's Girls Secondary School and St. Augustine's Boys Secondary School.

Facilities
The school is currently housed within the premises of the former St. Monica's School.  However, in view of growing student numbers there is growing pressure for a new larger purpose-built facility.

Academics
The full range of subjects is offered.  At GCSE A-level, the students can work with students from Aquinas Diocesan Grammar School to choose courses from Art & Design, Government & Politics, Biology, Health & Life Science, Physics, Business Studies, Religious Studies, Chemistry, History, Spanish, Design & Technology, Home Economics, Sport Studies, Drama & Theatre Studies, Digital Technology, and Irish.

Sports
Students can engage in a variety of sporting activities including athletics, basketball, badminton, camogie, cross-country, Gaelic football, hurling, netball and soccer.  The college also engages with a number of community sports organisations through the Sports within the Community scheme.  These include QUB basketball club, Bredagh GAC, St. Malachy’s GAC, Rosario FC, Doyle FC and Ulster Rugby.

Community activities
The college has established links with a number of community groups and encourages pupils to participate in their activities. Community links exist with the Society of Saint Vincent de Paul, Daughters of Charity and Trócaire.

Awards
The college has received a number of awards including the Silver Investors in People Award and the Investors in People Health and Wellbeing Award.

It gained the Green Flag by becoming an eco-friendlier environment.

In 2017, it received the Aisling award for Outstanding Achievement in Education.

In December 2019, it received the Diocese of Down & Connor Spirit of Catholic Education Award

It is a School of Sanctuary providing support to a large number of children of refugee families.

See also
 List of secondary schools in Belfast
 List of secondary schools in Northern Ireland

References

1992 establishments in Northern Ireland
Belfast
Educational institutions established in 1992
Catholic secondary schools in Northern Ireland